Jacob Summerlin (February 20, 1820 – November 4, 1893), aka the King of the Crackers and King of the Cracker Cow Hunters, was documented as the first child born in Florida after the land was ceded by Spain. This was again validated in about 2012-15 during Florida's 500-year celebration as Florida honored him as one of three people that were most influential in the past 500 years. Ponce de Leon was another of 3 honored.

Jacob Summerlin was known for his contributions to the early settlement of Florida, and especially for founding the county seats of Orange and Polk counties, which are Orlando and Bartow, respectively. In the years prior to the American Civil War, he was given slaves, whom he relinquished in exchange for cattle.

Summerlin was a highly successful cattleman utilizing his own sweat and brow up and down Florida, shipping cattle off to Cuba for most of his life. Also shipping to Savannah  and from Key West also shipping to Cuba.

Prior to school integration, Summerlin Academy, the school for White students in Bartow, was named for him. After the schools were integrated in 1968, all students attended there, and the name was changed to Bartow High School. Summerlin Academy was reestablished in 2006 as a military school within Bartow High School.

Jacob donated Lake Eola and land surrounding the lake in Orlando. Named Lake Eola by his son Judge Robert Summerlin for a woman he loved. Robert graduated with a law degree from Georgia in 1885-87, became mayor of Orlando for about 1885 to 1892, then was elected judge.

"King of the Crackers"
Summerlin earned much of his early fortune by hard work, personally driving cattle throughout Florida and raising cattle along the Peace River and Kissimmee River, night and day. Wild cattle brought to North America by the Spanish conquistadors roamed free across these vast stretches of land. Entrepreneurs could capture, breed, drive, and sell these cows for twelve to sixteen dollars each. Summerlin and his business partners developed a lucrative trade with Havana and with the US Naval Base at Key West.

Summerlin opposed secession, clearly demonstrating he obviously did not want to be part of a civil war. However, after the break out of the American Civil War, Jacob was quoted in official USA documents that he never killed any person. He was a generous hard working American cattleman, feeding soldiers in the civil war as was ordered by both Confederate and Union armies. Jacob and his partners provided beef and medicine to troops of both armies. Separately and privately, he still sailed past the Union blockade mostly at night to continue cattle sales to Cuba as usual. 

As a result of the war, Confederate money was worthless. But, with hard work and Union money that he earned, Jacob bought the 160-acre (0.65 km²) Blount homestead, much of which would later be given to Polk County. (Ft. Blount was the earlier name of Bartow, the present county seat.) After the war, Summerlin continued selling cattle to the Union soldiers at Fort Myers.

Summerlin amassed a fortune of 15,000 to 20,000 head of cattle during this period and was considered one of the wealthiest Floridians before he reached age 40. In this pre-banking era, Jacob kept his gold and silver at his cabin in trunks, meal sacks, tin meat cans, woolen socks, cigar boxes, behind door frames, in the rafters, or tossed in a corner. He used his wealth to purchase large tracts of land sprawling from Fort Meade to Fort Myers. He bought a wharf at Punta Rassa and a thousand acres (4 km²) nearby for cow pens, some of which he rented to other cattlemen.

Donations in Bartow and Orlando
He also personally donated $1100.00 for construction of Bartow's first two-story building which housed the Masonic lodge and school.

Summerlin also owned land in Orange County where he opened the Summerlin Hotel. When Orlando's wooden courthouse burned in 1868, there was pressure to move the county seat to the then-larger town of Sanford. It had been located nearby in Enterprise across the river from Sanford before 1857. General Henry Sanford was particularly involved in lobbying for the move to Sanford and offered free land for the new courthouse during a public meeting of the County Commission in 1875. Summerlin sat in the packed audience during Sanford's offer. Legend has it that as Sanford finished speaking, Summerlin rose to his feet and asked if he was done, Sanford replied "I have".

The county accepted his offer and repaid him over a 10-year period. Later that year, Orlando became incorporated with a population of 85; on August 4, Jacob Summerlin sat on the first Orlando City Council acting as Council president.

It was also Summerlin who donated a large tract of land in order for a fine park to be established in Orlando. In 1883, Summerlin came to a city council meeting and offered the land around the lake on the condition that it be beautified and turned into a park. He also required that the city plant trees and put a "driveway" around the lake. To ensure that the city followed through the stipulations of the donation, Summerlin put reverter clauses in the contract to allow his heirs to reclaim the property if the city failed in its obligations. That park is still maintained to his orders of it being kept beautiful. His son Judge Robert L Summerlin, mayor of Orlando named Lake Eola Lake Eola, after a fiancée, who died before they could marry.

Death
Jacob Summerlin died on November 4, 1893, aged 73, and was buried in Oak Hill Cemetery in Bartow.

References

External links
 family documents
 Polk County Courthouses
 Cow Cavalry History
 https://www.amazon.com/Jacob-Summerlin-Joe-Akerman-Jr/dp/1886104166/ref=sr_1_1?ie=UTF8&qid=1501102058&sr=8-1&keywords=Jacob+Summerlin

1820 births
1893 deaths
American city founders
People from Florida
History of Polk County, Florida
Florida pioneers
American cattlemen